The table of years in Irish television is a tabular display of all years in Irish television, for overview and quick navigation to any year.

Contents: 1950s - 1960s - 1970s - 1980s - 1990s - 2000s - 2010s

1950s in Irish television
1950s

1960s in Irish television
1960   1961   1962   1963   1964   1965   1966   1967   1968   1969

1970s in Irish television
1970   1971   1972   1973   1974   1975   1976   1977   1978   1979

1980s in Irish television
1980   1981   1982   1983   1984   1985   1986   1987   1988   1989

1990s in Irish television
1990   1991   1992   1993   1994   1995   1996   1997   1998   1999

2000s in Irish television
2000   2001   2002   2003   2004   2005   2006   2007   2008   2009

2010s in Irish television
2010   2011   2012   2013   2014   2015   2016   2017   2018   2019

2020s in Irish television
2020   2021
2022

Irish table
Tables of years